A pyrotechnic cocking charge is a device used to cock or re-cock a gas-operated automatic cannon, such as the Mauser BK-27 or the Gryazev-Shipunov GSh-6-23. Such devices are not necessary in an externally powered cannon, such as the electrically driven M61 Vulcan, where the external power source is used to operate the mechanism of the weapon. The number of charges carried varies by design – the GSh-6-23 has a generous complement of ten, while others have as few as one. One of the benefits of an automatic cannon that isn't powered electrically   is that they accelerate to their maximum rate of fire much more quickly. There is less "spin-up" time for the barrels than with an externally powered rotary cannon.

Autocannon